Nationality words link to articles with information on the nation's poetry or literature (for instance, Irish or France).

Events
July 10 – Paul Verlaine shoots at and wounds Arthur Rimbaud in Brussels.

Works published in English

United Kingdom
 Alexander Anderson, A Song of Labour, and Other Poems
 Robert Bridges, Poems by Robert Bridges (see also Poems 1879, 1880)
 Robert Browning, Red Cotton Night-Cap Country; or, Turf and Towers
 Edward Carpenter, Narcissus, and Other Poems
 Austin Dobson, Vignettes in Rhyme
 Dora Greenwell, Songs of Salvation
 William Morris, Love is Enough; or, The Freeing of Pharamond
 Emily Pfeiffer, Gerard's Monument, and Other Poems

United States
 Will Carleton, Farm Ballads
 William Dean Howells, Poems
 Henry Wadsworth Longfellow, Aftermath
 Bayard Taylor, Lars: A Pastoral of Norway

Works published in other languages

France
 Tristan Corbière, Les amours jaunes
 Arthur Rimbaud, Une Saison en Enfer ("A Season in Hell")
 Théodore de Banville, Trente-six ballades joyeuses, Paris: Lemerre; France
 Paul Verlaine:
 Romances sans paroles
 Art poétique, criticism

Awards and honors

Births
Death years link to the corresponding "[year] in poetry" article:
 January 9 – Hayim Nahman Bialik, חיים נחמן ביאליק (died 1934), Russian-born Hebrew poet
 January 7 – Charles Péguy (killed in action 1914), French poet and essayist
 February 26 – Tekkan Yosano, 与謝野 鉄幹, pen-name of Yosano Hiroshi (died 1935), Japanese late Meiji period, Taishō and early Shōwa period author and poet; husband of author Yosano Akiko; grandfather of cabinet minister and politician Kaoru Yosano (surname: Yosano)
 March 28 – Gilbert E. Brooke (died 1936), French-born English poet and colonial medical officer
 April 12 – Kumaran Asan (died 1924), Indian, Malayalam-language poet
 April 25 – Walter De la Mare (died 1956), English poet, short story writer and novelist
 August 3 – Alexander Posey (drowned 1908), Native American poet, journalist, humorist and politician
 August 13 – Dora Adele Shoemaker (died 1962), American poet and playwright
 October 10 – George Cabot Lodge (died 1909) American
 December 7 – Willa Cather (died 1947), American novelist and poet
 December 11 – Tilly Aston (died 1947), Australian
 December 12 – Lola Ridge (died 1941), Irish American anarchist and modernist poet, and editor of avant-garde, feminist and Marxist publications
 December 29 – Ovid Densusianu ("Ervin") (died 1938), Romanian poet, philologist, linguist, folklorist, literary historian, critic, academic and journalist
 Undated
 George Clarke, Canadian
 Clementine Krämer, née Cahnmann (died 1942 in Theresienstadt concentration camp), German poet and short-story writer

Deaths
Birth years link to the corresponding "[year] in poetry" article:
 April 26 – Vladimir Benediktov (born 1807), Russian poet and translator
 May 9 – Frederick Goddard Tuckerman (born 1821), American
 May 22 – Alessandro Manzoni (born 1785), Italian poet and novelist
 June 29 – Michael Madhusudan Dutt (মাইকেল মধুসূদন দত্ত also spelled "Maikel Modhushudôn Dôtto", "Datta" or "Dutta"), born Madhusudan Dutt (born 1824–1873), Indian, English-language poet and dramatist
 July 13 – Caroline Clive, also known as "Caroline Wigley Clive", 71 (born 1801),  English author and poet
 October 27 – Janet Hamilton (born 1795), Scottish poet
 December 24 – Rangga Warsita (born 1802), Javanese
 Undated
 Kasiprasad Ghose, Indian
 Dimitrios Paparrigopoulos (born 1843), Greek

See also

 19th century in poetry
 19th century in literature
 List of years in poetry
 List of years in literature
 Victorian literature
 French literature of the 19th century
 Poetry

Notes

19th-century poetry
Poetry